This is a list of street railroad operating in Florida in the United States.

Horse car companies
Railways using horse or mule power

 Altamonte Springs Street Railway
 Arcadia Street Railway and Improvement Company
 Avon Park Street Railway
 Bartow Street Railway
 Breakers Hotel Street Railway
 Cappo's South Beach Railway Anastasia Island
 Fort Myers Street Railway
 Fort Meade Street Railway
 Georgetown Tramway
 Green Cove Springs Street Railway
 Jacksonville and La Villa Street Railway Company
 Jacksonville and Suburban Railway
 Leesburg Transfer Company
 Longwood Horse Railway
 Main Street Railway
 Ocala, Silver Springs and Park Street Railroad
 Ocala Street Railway Company
 Orlando Street Railway
 Ormond Hotel Street Railway
 Palatka and Heights Street Railway
 Pensacola Street Car Company
 Pine Street Railway
 Sopchoppy-Panacea Street Railway
 St. Augustine and North Beach Railway
 Tallahassee Street Railway
 Tampa Street Railway
 Winter Park Street Railway, also known as *The Seminole Hotel Street Railway"

Electric street railways
Railways using overhead electric or storage battery power.

Central of Florida Railway
Consumers' Electric Light and Street Railway Company
Coral Gables Rapid Transit Corporation
Duval Traction Company
Everglades City Street Railway
Fernandina and Amelia Beach Railway
Florida Power and Light
Jacksonville Electric Company
Florida Power and Light Company
Jacksonville Traction Company
Key West Street Car Company
Main Street Railway
Miami Beach Electric Company
The City of Miami
North Jacksonville Street Railway, Town and Improvement Company
Ortega Traction Company
Palm Beach Railway and Power Company
Pensacola Electric Company
Pensacola Electric Terminal Railway Company
Pensacola Street Railway Company
Pensacola Terminal Company
Sanford and Everglades Railroad
South Jacksonville Municipal Railways  
St. Augustine and South Beach Railway
St. Johns Traction Company
Tampa Electric Company (actually TECO Line Streetcar)
Tampa Street Railway Company
Tampa Suburban Company

Interurban Passenger, Freight and/or electric freight railways
Electric railways which operated between towns or special industrial connections.

International Agricultural Corporation
Manatee Light and Traction Company
St. Augustine and South Beach Railway
St. Augustine and North Beach Railway
Sanford Traction Company Wholly owned by the Sanford and Everglades Railroad.
Pensacola Electric Terminal Railroad

Electric interurban railway projects
Electric railways planned but never completed.

Florida Interurban Railway and Tunnel
Jacksonville, Miami & Tampa Interurban Railway
Jacksonville & St. Augustine Public Service Corporation
Perry & Gulf Coast Traction

See also
List of town tramway systems in the United States#Florida

References

Passenger rail transportation in Florida
Flo
Street railroad